Consultus Fortunatianus, also known as C. Chirius Fortunatianus, was a Latin Christian rhetor who lived in the 4th-5th century AD, perhaps of African ancestry. He wrote an Ars rhetorica, in three books. This work was published before 435, since it was used by Martianus Capella. One of the manuscripts (Cod. Bodmer 146, 10th century) was owned by Francesco Petrarca, who studied and commented on it with many glossa.

References

External links
Rhetores Latini minores, Karl Halm (ed.), Lipsiae in aedibus B. G. Teubneri, 1863, pp. 81-134.

Ancient Roman rhetoricians
4th-century people
5th-century people